Andrej Urlep (born July 19, 1957) is a Slovenian professional basketball coach who is most recently served as the head coach for Śląsk Wrocław of the Polish Basketball League.

He is credited with reforming and modernising Polish domestic basketball.

For the 2019-2020 season, the Mono Vampire Basketball Club of Thailand announced that Urlep would be their head coach for the season. Urlep is a five-time Polish Basketball League Champion as a coach, and a two-times vice-champion. He also coached Slovenia's U22 team during the early stage of his career.

On October 11, 2021, he has signed with Śląsk Wrocław of the Polish Basketball League.

References

1957 births
Living people
Expatriate basketball people in Thailand
Slovenian basketball coaches
Slovenian expatriate basketball people in Lithuania
Slovenian expatriate basketball people in Poland
Sportspeople from Ljubljana